Husne Ara Kamal ( (1935 - 2009), also spelled Husneara Kamal and Hosne Ara Kamal was a Bangladeshi academician, philanthropist, and social worker who made significant contributions to the field of social welfare and women's empowerment in Bangladesh.

Early life and education
Husne Ara Kamal was born in 1935 to Anwara Begum. Her father was Md. Hafizur Rahman, a minister in East Pakistan. She was dedicated to pursuing her academic career. She obtained her post-graduation degree from Dhaka University, followed by a Master's degree from Bedford College, England. She then went on to receive her Master's degree in Social Science from Columbia University in the USA in 1979.

Career
Husne Ara Kamal started her career as a lecturer at the Institute of Social Welfare and Research, formerly known as Social Welfare College, of Dhaka University in 1960. During this time, she was also the Principal of Purana Paltan Girls' College in Dhaka. By 1966, Kamal had earned a reputation for her writings on children's literature.

After the Independence of Bangladesh, she recognized the impact of over-population in Bangladesh. She wrote "Family Life Education as a Factor in Promoting Family including Family Planning" which she detailed steps in educating women and dealing with the sociological aspects of this subject.

In 1991, she was appointed as the Director of the Institute and was promoted to the rank of professor in 1994. She retired from her position in 2001. 

Kamal was also an accomplished author and published several books on women and gender issues. She has also written many books for children. Some of the books are:
পাখীরা ঘরে ফিরবেই (The birds will return home)
দায়িত্ব দুঃস্থ নারী (Women in distress)
বৃক্ষ তোমাকে ভালোবাসি
Paribarer Akok Daittee Nari " ( 1989 ) ( Women in Charge of Household ) 
Ivur jonne Chhora
Fuljhuri

Philanthropy and awards
Husne Ara Kamal was a selfless philanthropist who devoted her life to the service of society. She was heavily involved in women's empowerment and worked tirelessly to improve the lives of women and children. She was actively associated with various social service organizations and NGOs such as Palli Shishu Foundation, B.M.N., C.R.P, Women for Women, Women's Voluntary Association (WVA), Mental Health Association, and Hunger Project..

In recognition of her services, She was awarded the 'Ratnagarva Ma' award in September 2004.

Personal life
Husne Ara Kamal was married to Chief Justice Mustafa Kamal, son of Abbasuddin Ahmed, and had three daughters named Nashid Kamal, Naeela K Sattar, and Nazeefa Monem. Her granddaughter, Armeen Musa, is a grammy nominated singer-songwriter and composer.

Husne Ara Kamal passed away on April 16, 2009, leaving behind a legacy of service to society.

References 

1935 births
2009 deaths
University of Dhaka alumni
Academic staff of the University of Dhaka
Bangladeshi women academics
Bangladeshi women writers
Bangladeshi feminists
Bangladeshi women's rights activists
Bangladeshi writers
Bangladeshi academic administrators
Bangladeshi women scholars
Bangladeshi human rights activists
Bengali Muslims
Bengali writers
Women school principals and headteachers